Eslarn (Northern Bavarian: Isling) is a market town and municipality in the district of Neustadt an der Waldnaab in Bavaria in Germany.

Neighbouring communities 
The neighbouring communities clockwise: Waidhaus, Rozvadov, Třemešné, Bělá nad Radbuzou, Schönsee, Oberviechtach, Moosbach (Oberpfalz) and Pleystein.

References

Neustadt an der Waldnaab (district)
Upper Palatine Forest